Virginia McLachlan (born September 17, 1992) is a Canadian Paralympic sprinter who won 2 bronze medals in women's T35 200 m and 100 m run at the 2012 Summer Paralympics. She also won 2 silver medals at 2011 Parapan American Games in Guadalajara, Mexico for the same distances. Currently she attends University of Windsor but is planning to participate at the 2013 IPC World Championships which will be held in July in France.

References

External links 
 
 Virginia McLachlan

1992 births
Living people
Athletes (track and field) at the 2012 Summer Paralympics
Medalists at the 2012 Summer Paralympics
Paralympic bronze medalists for Canada
Paralympic track and field athletes of Canada
Sportspeople from Windsor, Ontario
Paralympic medalists in athletics (track and field)
Medalists at the 2011 Parapan American Games